The San Marga Iraivan Temple is a Chola-style Hindu temple dedicated to the Lord Shiva located on the Kauai island in the state of Hawaii, USA. "Iraivan" means "He who is worshipped," and is one of the oldest words for God in the Tamil language. It is the first all-stone, white granite temple to be built in the western hemisphere whose construction began in 1990. The Iraivan Temple is located next to the Wailua River and 8 km from Mount Waialeale. It is maintained by the Saiva Siddhanta Temple which is also known as Kauai Aadheenam and Kauai's Hindu Monastery. The temple is under construction. Spatika (Crystal) Lingam will be housed in it after its construction completes, till then crystal Lingam is placed in the Kadavul temple. The centerpiece of the temple will be a 700-pound, 39-inch-tall, uncut quartz crystal, believed to be the largest six-sided, single-pointed crystal ever found 

Sri Trichy Mahaswamigal (d. 2005) of Kailash Ashram, Bangalore,  describes the temple's importance: "The Iraivan Temple is going to be to America what the temples of Chidambaram, Madurai, Rameshwaram, and other great Siva temples are to India."

History
Iraivan Temple was inspired by a vision of Sivaya Subramuniyaswami, on February 15, 1975, in which he saw Lord Shiva walking on the land where the temple is now located. It is intended as a place of pilgrimage for Hindus worldwide. Subramuniyaswami set three parameters for its design and construction:
 that it follow traditional design according to the Saiva Āgama
 that it be designed to last 1,000 years 
 that it be entirely carved by hand, without the use of any machinery. 
The temple design was completed by V. Ganapati Sthapati in the late 1980s. Carving of the 4,000-plus blocks of granite commenced in 1990 at a worksite in Bangalore, India and then transported to temple site at Kauai. Beginning in 2001, the stone were shipped to Kauai and assembly begun by a team of silpi temple carvers under the direction of a master architect or sthapati. The 3.2 million pound temple is expected to be completed in a few years. Two Indian swamis: Sri Sivaratnapuri Mahaswamigal (popularly known as Tiruchi Swami) and  Sri Balagangadharanatha are assistting with the project and in 1990 provided eleven acres of land outside Bangalore.

Architecture

The temple is a Chola-Style temple and possesses a number of rare architectural features. The first is that it is being carved entirely by hand. Craftsmen follow and preserve traditional methods, shaping the stone with small hammers and utilizing over 70 types of chisels. The second feature is the  foundation is made of a crack-free, 7,000-psi formula using "fly ash," a by-product of coal burning. Fly ash consists of inorganic, incombustible matter present in the coal that has been fused during combustion into a glassy structure. The foundation was designed by Dr. Kumar Mehta, a materials scientist at the University of California, Berkeley, and was the first project to demonstrate his theories on the use of fly ash in concrete. The third set of features are exhibitions of the stone carver's craft. The foremost of these are two sets of "musical pillars" whose tall rods are designed to resonate precise musical tones when struck with a mallet. Others include six stone lions carved into the pillars each of which contains a stone ball freely rotatable in its mouth but not removable, a large stone bell, and  stone chains with loose links.

The temple is facing south and built according to vastu science. Vastu architecture aims at creating a space that will elevate the vibration of the individual to resonate with the vibration of the built space, which in turn is in tune with universal space. The whole space of the temple is defined in multiples and fractions of one unit,  and 71/4 inches. Pillars through the temple are spaced and structured to serve as energy points for the building. Iraivan Temple will be completely free of electricity for mystical reasons, as decreed by Satguru Sivaya Subramuniyaswami.

The main murti, or worshipful icon, is a rare , a pointed, six-faced 700-pound clear quartz crystal. In the early 1980s, Subramuniyaswami had been seeing the crystal in his dreams. He found it in 1987 and  brought it to Kauai. The stone, estimated to be 50 million years old, was not cut out of rock by a miner. Instead, it was found in a perfect state encased in mud, probably harvested from its original outcropping by an earthquake.

The quartz crystal (sphatika) of the Sivalinga is considered specially sacred because it represents the element akasha.

Current status

The construction of the main pavilion is complete, and a few other ancillary structures are being worked on. The temple is expected to be inaugurated with a maha kumbha abhishekam in a few years.

The current head of the project is Satguru Bodhinatha Veylanswami, leader of the monastery and successor to the founder.

Gallery

References

External links
 
 Iraivan Temple at Hawaii
 A Concrete Slab for Y3K

Asian-American culture in Hawaii
Buildings and structures in Kauai County, Hawaii
Buildings and structures under construction in the United States
Hindu temples in Hawaii
Shiva temples